Lasha Shergelashvili (born 17 January 1992) is a Georgian professional footballer.

International career
Shergelashvili made his debut for the Georgia national football team on 23 January 2017 in a friendly against Uzbekistan.

Honours
Torpedo Kutaisi
Georgian Cup: 2022

Samtredia
Georgian League: 2016

Dinamo Tbilisi
Georgian Cup: 2014-15
Super Cup: 2015
PAS Giannina

 Super League Greece 2: 2019–20

References

External links
 
 
 

1992 births
Footballers from Tbilisi
Living people
Footballers from Georgia (country)
Georgia (country) international footballers
Association football defenders
FC Dinamo Tbilisi players
FK RFS players
PAS Giannina F.C. players
Erovnuli Liga players
Latvian Higher League players